The IEEE Richard W. Hamming Medal is presented annually to up to three persons, for outstanding achievements in information sciences, information systems and information technology. The recipients receive a gold medal, together with a replica in bronze, a certificate and an honorarium.

The award was established in 1986 by the Institute of Electrical and Electronics Engineers (IEEE) and is sponsored by Qualcomm, Inc. It is named after Richard W. Hamming, whose work has had many implications for computer science and telecommunications.  His contributions include the invention of the Hamming code, and error-correcting code.

Recipients
The following people have received the IEEE Richard W. Hamming Medal:

See also
 Richard W. Hamming
 List of computer science awards
 Prizes named after people

References 

Computer science awards
Information science awards
Awards established in 1986
Richard W. Hamming Medal